Pugneys Country Park is a  park located on the A636 between Wakefield, West Yorkshire, England and Junction 39 of the M1 motorway. It is a Local Nature Reserve.

The area was developed from a former opencast mine and a sand and gravel quarry and was opened to the public in 1985. It is overlooked by Sandal Castle.

The park comprises two lakes, the larger of which is dedicated to non-powered watersports and the smaller lake is designated as a nature reserve.

A  gauge miniature railway, running round part of the larger lake, operates on weekends and bank holidays, and cafeteria facilities are available.

The nature reserve is home to a large flock of non-breeding swans, with up to 100 in residence at any time.

The lakes serve as a flood defence by providing an overflow from the River Calder.

References

Parks and commons in Wakefield
Country parks in Yorkshire
Local Nature Reserves in West Yorkshire